is a Japanese announcer for Fuji Television.

Personal life
On May 11, 2017, he officially married Maho Kuwako, an NHK female announcer. The Sankei Sports newspaper wrote that Tanioka was divorcing Kuwako just one year after their marriage. Tanioka announced that he is now remarried with another woman on June 2, 2020.

Current programmes

In the broadcast on 23 March 2017, he appeared as part of Fuji TV male announcers team and did the commentary during the 3rd game Pinball Runner.

Former appearances

Horse Racing GI Live history

References

External links
 
 

Japanese announcers
Hosei University alumni
People from Kōchi Prefecture
1987 births
Living people